Finella dubia is a species of sea snail, a marine gastropod mollusk in the family Scaliolidae.

Distribution

Description 
The maximum recorded shell length is 4.9 mm.

Habitat 
Minimum recorded depth is 0 m. Maximum recorded depth is 805 m.

References

Scaliolidae
Gastropods described in 1840